Suleman Shafqat (born 3 March 2001) is a Pakistani cricketer. He made his List A debut for the Pakistan Emerging Team against the Bangladesh Emerging Team in the 2018 ACC Emerging Teams Asia Cup on 9 December 2018. Prior to his List A debut, he was named in Pakistan's squad for the 2018 Under-19 Cricket World Cup.

References

External links
 

2001 births
Living people
Pakistani cricketers
Place of birth missing (living people)
Central Punjab cricketers